Alexander Hettich (born 11 March 1988) is a German footballer who plays as a midfielder for VfR Marienhagen 1930.

References

External links
 
 

German footballers
Association football midfielders
Bayer 04 Leverkusen II players
KFC Uerdingen 05 players
Sportfreunde Siegen players
FC Carl Zeiss Jena players
Sportfreunde Lotte players
3. Liga players
1988 births
Living people